SMAS may refer to:

 Super Mario All-Stars, a video game
 Superficial muscular aponeurotic system, a group of facial muscles
 Superior mesenteric artery syndrome, a very rare illness that causes difficulty in digestion of food
 Spinal muscular atrophies (SMAs), a class of genetic muscular disorders

See also

 SMA (disambiguation), for the singular

Acronym for (Saifullah Muhammad Aliyu Sokoto)